
The Latok group is a small cluster of dramatic rock peaks in the Panmah Muztagh, part of the central Karakoram mountain range in Pakistan. They lie just to the east of the Ogre group, dominated by Baintha Brakk. To the immediate south of the Latok group lies the Baintha Lukpar Glacier, a small tributary of the Biafo Glacier, one of the main glaciers of the Karakoram. On the north side of the group lies the Choktoi Glacier.

The group comprises four main summits, each listed here with its relative position in the group, elevation, and first ascent date:
 Latok I, north-central, 7,145 m, climbed 1979
 Latok II, west, 7,108 m, climbed 1977
 Latok III, east, 6,949 m, climbed 1979
 Latok IV, southeast, 6,456 m, climbed 1980

Climbing history
All of the summits are notable for their extreme technical difficulty, and they have been the scene of some of the hardest climbing done at high altitude anywhere in the world.
First attempt on the North Ridge of Latok I: The North Ridge was first attempted in 1978 by an American expedition consisting of Jim Donini, Jeff Lowe, Michael Kennedy and George Lowe came within a few pitches of the summit. This climb and successful retreat has fueled continued interest in the mountain.
First Ascent of Latok I: Latok I was first climbed in 1979 by a Japanese expedition led by Naoki Takada; the first summit party comprised Sin'e Matsumi, Tsuneo Shigehiro, Yu Watanabe, and they were followed three days later by Hideo Muto, Jun'ichi Oku, and Kota Endo. They started from the Baintha Lukpar Glacier and climbed a buttress to reach the East Ridge.

First Ascent of Latok II: Latok II saw its first ascent in 1977, by an Italian group led by Arturo Bergamaschi. (This was the first successful ascent in the group.) They climbed the southeast face of the peak, and Ezio Alimonta, Toni Masé and Renato Valentini made the summit.

First Ascent of Latok III: The first ascent of Latok III came in 1979, by a Japanese team under the leadership of Yoji Teranishi. They climbed the Southwest Ridge, and the summit party were Teranishi, Kazushige Takami, and Sakae Mori. The second ascent, via the same route, came in 1988, by an Italian party. This was the first repeat ascent of any peak in the group.
1997 Expedition on Latok II: A notable next ascent of Latok II came in 1997, when a very strong team composed of Alexander Huber, Thomas Huber, Toni Gutsch, and Conrad Anker climbed the sheer West Face of the peak. They described as putting "El Capitan on top of Denali": a  vertical rock wall with a base at  elevation.
He was shifted to Combined Military Hospital (CMH) in Skardu for medical attention. His partner, Sergey Glazunov, was found dead. The rescued climber thanked armed forces of Pakistan for saving his life and praised the hospitality and bravery of the nation.
First Ascent of Latok I through the North Face: Slovenian climbers Aleš Česen (36), Luka Stražar (29) and British climber Tom Livingstone (27) climbed three-quarters via North Ridge of Latok I (7145m) before traversing the West side and summiting through the original route on 9 August 2018. They made the second ever ascent on the mountain after 1979.
First Ascent of North Ridge: Russian climbers Alexander Gukov (42) and Sergey Glazunov (26) left on July 15 to climb Latok I via the unclimbed North Ridge. They managed to climb to the top of North Ridge, but failed to reach the summit of Latok I. During the descent, Glazunov fell to his death and Gukov was stranded for 7 days in bivouac on the ridge. He was eventually rescued by helicopter.

References

Mountains of Gilgit-Baltistan
Seven-thousanders of the Karakoram
Mountain ranges of the Karakoram